Larry Glenn Wright (born November 23, 1954) is an American former professional basketball player and coach. He played college basketball for the Grambling State Tigers and was the Southwestern Athletic Conference Men's Basketball Player of the Year in 1976. Wright played in the National Basketball Association (NBA) for the Washington Bullets and the Detroit Pistons. He also played for six seasons in Italy. After his playing retirement, Wright joined the Tigers as an assistant coach from 1990 to 1992 and returned as the head coach from 1999 to 2008.

College career
Wright was a highly recruited prospect while he played at Western High School in Washington, D.C. He chose to commit to the Grambling State Tigers in honor of his mentor Hershell West, who had played for the Tigers and coached Wright when he played at Richwood High School in Louisiana. From 1973–76, Wright was one of the most decorated Grambling players. In 1974, he was named the Southwestern Athletic Conference Freshman of the year. He was also a two-time All-SWAC selection for the remainder of his career, and a two-time first team NCAA Small College All-America. He led the university to the 1976 SWAC Tournament Championship. After being named the SWAC Player-of-the-Year in 1975–76 as a junior, he decided to declare for the 1976 NBA draft.

Professional career

NBA
Wright was selected with the 14th pick overall in the 1976 NBA draft by the Washington Bullets. He played a significant part of the Bullets' successful team of the late 1970s, as a substitute. With the Bullets he won an NBA title in 1978 and reached the Finals the next year. After a disappointing season in which they were knocked out from the playoffs by the Philadelphia 76ers, he was traded to the Detroit Pistons, for whom he played only 46 games in two seasons. He decided to move to Italy in 1982 and signed with Banco di Roma.

Superstar in Italy
Wright was an immediate star in Italy. The team finished the regular season in first place and reached the finals series against Olimpia Milano after defeating  European champions Ford Cantù in the semi final series, with homecourt advantage in hand in the final. Roma won the series 2 games to 1 and won its first ever Italian championship. The next season was even greater, as Roma participated in the FIBA European Champions Cup as Italian champions, and Wright provided one stellar performance after another. Roma finished the Final group stage first placed tied with Barcelona, so the two teams qualified for the final game for the European champions cup in Geneva. Wright was the top scorer for his team, of the 79-73 final win, scoring 27 points and leading Roma to its first ever European title in their first finals appearance. Wright was also selected as the European player of the year. Although he had a successful season, Wright left the team after failing to qualify to the Italian playoffs and signed with Fantoni Udine where he played for two seasons. In 1987 he returned to Banco di Roma for one more season.

Coaching career
Wright already was a player-coach in his last days in Italy. He was appointed assistant coach at Grambling in 1990 and stayed for office for two seasons. Afterwards he was a scout for the Seattle SuperSonics and the Washington Wizards, and an assistance coach at Quachita High School in his hometown of Monroe, Louisiana. In 1999 Wright was appointed head coach at Grambling. He was released from his duties in April 2008.

Personal life

He is married to Jacqueline Bradford, of Jonesboro, La. in May 1977.  They have three children: Larry Jr., Ashana, and Lance. Larry Jr is an NFL scout with the Houston Texans. He also has a daughter named Imani, a standout basketball player in her own right, who graduated high school in 2013, and went on to play college ball at Baylor for her freshman and sophomore years (2013-2015) before transferring to Florida State where she had to sit out a year.  All three of Larry and Jacqueline's children were scholarship athletes.  Larry Jr. signed at Notre Dame out of high school in 1994 and graduated from Louisiana Tech University (1995–1998), where he was a three-year letterman.  Ashana played basketball at Grambling State University (1995–1999), where she was a four-year letter winner on the Lady Tigers basketball team while winning four straight conference championships and never losing a home game in four years.  Lance was a three-year starter at offensive center on the Grambling football team (2000–2004).

References

External links
Larry Wright NBA Statistics at Basketball-Reference.com
Larry Wright at LegaBasket.it

1954 births
Living people
African-American basketball coaches
African-American basketball players
American expatriate basketball people in Italy
American men's basketball coaches
American men's basketball players
Basketball coaches from Louisiana
Basketball players from Louisiana
College men's basketball head coaches in the United States
Detroit Pistons players
Grambling State Tigers men's basketball coaches
Grambling State Tigers men's basketball players
Pallacanestro Virtus Roma players
Pallalcesto Amatori Udine players
Parade High School All-Americans (boys' basketball)
Point guards
Sportspeople from Monroe, Louisiana
Washington Bullets draft picks
Washington Bullets players
21st-century African-American people
20th-century African-American sportspeople